Aniella di Beltrano or Anniella di Rosa (1613–1649) was an Italian woman painter of the Baroque period, active in Naples. She trained with Massimo Stanzione, who was a fellow pupil with her husband, Agostino Beltrano (also called Agostiniello) (1616–1665). It is said that her husband stabbed her to death in a fit of jealousy. Her recognized output of paintings is minimal. Attributed to her by Grossi were the ceiling paintings (since removed) of the Birth and Death of the Virgin for the church of Pietà dei Turchini; the portrait of San Biago in the church of the Sanità.

References

 

1613 births
1649 deaths
17th-century Italian painters
17th-century Italian women artists
Italian women painters
Italian Baroque painters
Painters from Naples